San Juanito is a town and municipality in the Meta Department, Colombia. San Juanito has an elevation of 2,018 metres. San Juanito is situated southwest of Vda. El Tablón, and south of Alto Buenavista.

References

Municipalities of Meta Department